Emma B. Alrich (Eldridge; April 4, 1845 – December 15, 1925) was an American journalist, author, and educator. Though she hailed from New Jersey, she removed to Kansas after marriage.  Alrich served as Filing Clerk of the Kansas Legislature, and was the only woman in her day who served as superintendent of the city schools of Mitchell County, Kansas. She was a charter member of the National Woman's Relief Corps, as well as its national senior vice-president. She was the department president of Kansas, and charter member of the organization in 1883 at Denver, Colorado. Eldridge died in 1925.

Early years and education
Emma B. Eldridge was born in Cape May County, New Jersey, April 4, 1845. She was a first child. At the age of three, a New Testament was given to her as a prize because she could read it. Two years later, she was selling blackberries to buy an arithmetic book. At age twelve, she joined the Baptist Church and she began to write for the county paper.

When she was sixteen, Alrich taught the summer school at her home. In 1862, she entered the State Normal School (now The College of New Jersey) in Trenton, New Jersey, going out for six months in the middle of the course to earn the money to finish it. She was graduated in June, 1864, as valedictorian of her class.

Career

Alrich began to teach in a summer school immediately following her graduation. On February 13, 1886, she married Levi L. Alrich, who had won laurels as one of Baker's Cavalry, of 71st Pennsylvania Infantry. Her first two years of married life were spent in Philadelphia, Pennsylvania. In 1876, the Centennial opened up new possibilities and the couple settled in Cawker City, Kansas. There, she again taught school, was the first woman in Mitchell County to take the highest grade certificate, and the only woman at the time who served as superintendent of the city schools. She was a supporter of teachers' meetings, church social gatherings, a public library and a woman's club.

In 1883, her husband's failing health compelled a change in business. He bought the Free Press, and changed its name to the Public Record. All the work of the office was done by their family. Besides her journalistic work, she served two years on the board of teachers' examiners. She was one of the forty who organized the National Woman's Relief Corps, one of the three who founded the Woman's Hesperian Library Club, and was the founder of the Kansas Woman's Press Association. Alrich had little time for purely literary work.

Death
She died December 15, 1925, in Cawker City, and was buried in the Prairie Grove Cemetery.

References

Attribution

Bibliography

External links
 
 Emma B. Alrich at womansreliefcorps.org

1845 births
1925 deaths
19th-century American women writers
19th-century American journalists
19th-century American educators
19th-century American women educators
The College of New Jersey alumni
People from Cape May County, New Jersey
American women journalists
Writers from New Jersey
Schoolteachers from Kansas
School superintendents in Kansas
Woman's Relief Corps people
Wikipedia articles incorporating text from A Woman of the Century